Marina Olegovna Chernova (born 7 March 1996) is a Russian female acrobatic gymnast. With her partner, Revaz Gurgenidze, Chernova came 1st in the 2014 Acrobatic Gymnastics World Championships. With her partner Georgii Pataraia, Chernova came 1st at the 2016 Acrobatic Gymnastics World Championships.

References

External links
 

1996 births
Living people
Russian acrobatic gymnasts
Female acrobatic gymnasts
Medalists at the Acrobatic Gymnastics World Championships
World Games gold medalists
Competitors at the 2017 World Games
European Games medalists in gymnastics
European Games gold medalists for Russia
Gymnasts at the 2015 European Games
21st-century Russian women